Stadionul Tudor Vladimirescu is a multi-purpose stadium in Târgu Jiu, Romania. It serves as the home ground of Viitorul Târgu Jiu. The facility can also be used for a variety of other activities such as track and field and concerts.  

The stadium replaced the former Stadionul Tudor Vladimirescu, being also named for Wallachian hero Tudor Vladimirescu. 

It was opened on 25 October 2019 when Gorj County native Constantina Diță cut the ribbon on new stadium.

See also
List of football stadiums in Romania

References

 
 

CS Pandurii Târgu Jiu 
Football venues in Romania
Buildings and structures in Târgu Jiu
Multi-purpose stadiums in Romania